Stenalia aterrima is a beetle in the genus Stenalia of the family Mordellidae. It was described in 1955.

References

aterrima
Beetles described in 1955